New Wave is the ninth studio album by American industrial metal band Powerman 5000. It was released on October 27, 2017 through Pavement Entertainment.  To support the album's release, Powerman 5000 toured the United States through the end of 2017 on the New Wave Tour.

Reception

Blabbermouth.net gave the album a rating of 8 out of 10, calling it "a lot of fun".

Metal Hammer / Team Rock named it one of the 10 worst albums of 2017, referring to it "at best, is all a bit dated and trite, and at worst is desperately dunderheaded cack that makes Five Finger Death Punch sound like Devin Townsend."

Track listing

Personnel

Members
Spider One – vocals
 Ryan Hernandez – guitars
 Ty Oliver – guitars
 Murv Douglas – bass
 DJ Rattan – drums

Additional musicians
 Greg Johnson – additional guitars
 Kevin Garcia – additional drums

Production
Greg Johnson, Spider One – producers
Recorded at Starlight Manor (Burbank, California) and Clearlake Studios (California)

References

Powerman 5000 albums